Sebastián Alejandro Bini (born 21 December 1979 in Buenos Aires, Argentina) is a former Argentinian footballer and manager.

External links
 BDFA profile

1979 births
Living people
Footballers from Buenos Aires
Argentine footballers
Association football midfielders
C.S.D. Municipal players
Deportivo Zacapa players
Comunicaciones F.C. players
Aurora F.C. players
F.C. Motagua players
C.D. FAS footballers
Expatriate footballers in Guatemala
Expatriate footballers in Honduras
Expatriate footballers in El Salvador
Liga Nacional de Fútbol Profesional de Honduras players
Argentine football managers
C.S.D. Municipal managers
Expatriate football managers in Guatemala